William Gibson Haig Clark, Baron Clark of Kempston,  (18 October 1917 – 6 October 2004) was a British Conservative politician who sat for a total of 28 years as a member of Parliament for three constituencies. He was also a Member of the House of Lords.

Early life
Clark was educated at Battersea Polytechnic, qualifying in accountancy in 1941. From 1941 to 1946 he served in World War II in Britain and India in the Royal Army Ordnance Corps, gaining the rank of major. He became involved in business, particularly investing in cane sugar production, with interests in St Kitts and Belize, and in property in the UK. He was also a consultant to Tate&Lyle.

Political career
In 1949, Clark was elected to Wandsworth Borough Council, serving until 1953. He was unsuccessful in his attempt to win a seat on the London County Council and stood without success in the 1955 general election in Northampton.

Clark was elected to Parliament for Nottingham South in 1959, serving on the opposition front bench from 1964 to 1966, the only period in his career. He lost his seat in 1966.
He returned to Parliament as the MP for East Surrey in 1970, and from 1974 until he retired in 1992 for its largely successor seat after boundary changes, Croydon South. Sir Geoffrey Howe succeeded him in the East Surrey seat when he was transferred from the Reigate seat close by. He was active in the 1970s in restoring Conservative Party finances to a sustainable levels. He identified with the right wing of the party and voted against British membership of the Common Market in 1971. He chaired the Conservative backbench Finance Committee from 1979 until 1992, encouraging Margaret Thatcher to pursue financial stability and free enterprise and defending her policies on television and radio. He was knighted in 1980 and in 1990 was made a Privy Counsellor.

Following his retirement Clark received a life peerage on 21 July 1992 as Baron Clark of Kempston, of Kempston in the County of Bedfordshire, and was an active contributor to House of Lords debates.

Personal life
Clark was married to Irene Rands and had three sons and a daughter.

Arms

References

External links 

Obituary: Lord Clark of Kempston, The Guardian, 8 October 2004

Conservative Party (UK) MPs for English constituencies
Politics of the London Borough of Croydon
1917 births
2004 deaths
Royal Army Ordnance Corps officers
Councillors in Greater London
Members of the Privy Council of the United Kingdom
Clark of Kempston
UK MPs 1959–1964
UK MPs 1964–1966
UK MPs 1970–1974
UK MPs 1974
UK MPs 1974–1979
UK MPs 1979–1983
UK MPs 1983–1987
UK MPs 1987–1992
Alumni of the University of Surrey
Knights Bachelor
Members of Wandsworth Metropolitan Borough Council
British Army personnel of World War II
Life peers created by Elizabeth II